Isata Jabbie Kabbah is a Sierra Leonean politician. She is president of the All Political Parties Women Association, APPWA. She is the widow of the 3rd President of Sierra Leone Ahmed Tejan Kabbah.

She is the former women’s leader of the Sierra Leone People's Party (SLPP).

On 11 May 2008, she married Ahmed Tejan Kabbah, then President of Sierra Leone, 40 years her senior.

References 

Living people
First Ladies of Sierra Leone
Year of birth missing (living people)